Plano Independent School District (PISD or Plano ISD) is an independent school district in southwestern Collin County, Texas, based in Plano. 

PISD is the 18th largest school district in Texas and the 82nd largest in the United States. The school district serves over 50,000students and employs approximately 3,800faculty members spread across 73schools and 2special and 4early education centers. PISD's operating budget was million as of 2021.

The district named Sara Bonser as Interim Superintendent in November 2017. On March 6, 2018, Sara Bonser became Superintendent of Plano ISD, becoming the first female to hold the Superintendent title for the District. (retired in early 2022)

In 2010, the school district was rated "recognized" by the Texas Education Agency.

The district also takes students from northern portions of Dallas, Richardson, Allen, Carrollton, Garland, Lucas, Murphy, Parker, and Wylie.

There are two areas in North Dallas that are in Plano ISD, both in Collin County: one that is east of Midway Road, south of the George Bush Turnpike, and west of Waterview Parkway; and a group of apartments around Horizon North Parkway. These areas, annexed into the City of Dallas after 1960, are generally high income.

Educational Structure
Plano ISD has an educational structure that differs from the typical U.S. educational pattern. Primary education in PISD, following the typical U.S. structure, consists of 44 elementary schools that serve the kindergarten through fifth grades. However, PISD's system of secondary education consists of 13 middle schools that serve the sixth through eighth grades, 6 'high schools' that serve the ninth and tenth grades, and 3 'senior high schools' that serve the eleventh and twelfth grades. The 'high school' and 'senior high school' system is a departure from the standard U.S. high school that serves the ninth through twelfth grades.

PISD students attend schools based primarily on the geographic location of their homes. Schools of a lower level feed into specific schools at the next highest level. The three exceptions to the feeder system is for students wishing to participate in the International Baccalaureate program, the Health Sciences Academy, or the STEAM Academy. Parents of students may also request transfers out of their students' assigned schools for various reasons (such as to take classes unique to a particular school).

This system leads to very large graduating classes and overall student populations. At Plano Senior High School, Plano East Senior High School, and Plano West Senior High School, the current student populations are listed as 2,567, 2,795, and 2,160 students, respectively. Each year's graduating class is approximately half of each number. Previous years' Graduation Commencement Ceremonies have taken place at Ford Center and the Dallas Convention Center.

Board of Trustees
The Board of Trustees includes seven at-large elected members that oversee the district. Elections are held in May in odd-numbered years for either three or four candidates. The next election is May, 2019 for seats 4, 5, 7 and the remaining 2 years for seat 6. The Board elects a President, Vice President and Secretary.

Academics and Honors
All three of PISD's senior high schools were recently listed in the top 250 of Newsweeks list of 1000 top high schools in America. In the 2012 list, Plano West Senior High School was ranked as 63rd in the country, Plano Senior High School was ranked 108th, and Plano East Senior High School was ranked 243rd. In 2011, Plano West Senior High had been ranked 98 on Newsweek's "America's Best High Schools," and Plano East Senior High had been ranked 461. Plano ISD schools reportedly administer more Advanced Placement tests than any other school district west of the Mississippi River.

Plano ISD opened three academies (4-year high schools) in the 2013–2014 school year. The first "Academy High School", a STEAM, project based, high school that serves grades 9–12.

The second magnet focuses on Health science, and is housed at Williams High School for grades 9–10, and will continue at Plano East Senior High School for grades 11–12.

Additionally, the district has modified its existing International Baccalaureate program so that all four grades will be housed at Plano East Senior High as a "school within a school".

The mean SAT score (math plus reading) for the district is 1152 out of 1600, and the mean ACT (test) composite score is 25.7, with 83.5% of district students taking the SAT or ACT. 43.4% of district students take AP or IB courses, and 84.3% of those students pass their AP or IB exam(s). Plano ISD offers all AP courses except AP Italian Language and Culture and AP Japanese Language and Culture to students.

In the 2012–2013 school year, Plano ISD had 128 students named National Merit Semifinalists, more than any other Texas school district. Also in the 2012–2013 school year, ten PISD students were named semifinalists in the Siemens Competition, and two were named as finalists. In the state of Texas, a total of thirty eight and eleven students, respectively, captured those honors in the Siemens competition. In the 2011–2012 school year, 76 students were selected as All-state musicians.

Demographics

In the 1990s Plano ISD received many non-Hispanic white families leaving urban areas. However this changed in the period from 1997 to 2015 as the number of non-Hispanic white children in Plano ISD declined by 10,000.

Bilingual programs
In 1991 Plano ISD began a Chinese bilingual program for preschool and kindergarten students developed by Donna Lam. It is one of two Chinese bilingual programs in the State of Texas, along with the one established by the Austin Independent School District. It was established after Chinese professionals began to settle Plano.

Controversies
An attorney from the school district requested a retraction. O'Reilly later retracted his allegation on 20 December. O'Reilly had mistakenly included clothing among the items banned by PISD, while the ongoing lawsuit against the district only alleges the banning of the distribution of written religious materials.

On , prior to the school "winter parties, Judge Paul Brown of the US District Court for the Eastern District of Texas issued a Temporary Restraining Order, requiring PISD to lift these restrictions. The Morgan, et al., v. Plano Independent School District (PISD) case began in 2003, with school officials even banning students from using red and green napkins and paper plates to a school-sponsored "holiday" party.

In another more serious legal dispute, Plano ISD was found to have violated First Amendment rights of parents during public meetings about the implementation of a controversial new math curriculum, "Connected Math". During several years of appeals by PISD, the ruling was consistently upheld at all levels, including the 5th U.S. Circuit Court of Appeals (in July 2003). It is important to note that this was a settlement of the judgment, not the ruling of a First Amendment rights violation by the district.

In a Decision of the US District Court granting a preliminary injunction against Plano ISD, the judge said, part, "The issue in this case is not one of sponsorship or the lack thereof, but of the flagrant denial for equal access guaranteed to S.W.A.T. ... The harm at issue is irreparable because it inhibits the exercise of Plaintiff's First Amendment freedoms of speech and religion." On , Plano ISD offered, and SWAT accepted, an Offer of Settlement, which included the district's promise to change its discriminatory policy.

In , following a complaint by the parents of a student, the Plano ISD textbook board decided to remove the textbook, Culture and Values: A Survey of the Humanities: Alternative Volume, from its Humanities curriculum because the illustrations of works of art included nudity and various sex acts. After a public outcry, the decision was reversed within days.

On , PISD became the subject of criticism due to its response to the racially motivated assault of an eighth-grade student of Haggard Middle School at the hands of his classmates during a "non-school-related, off-campus" event. The victim stated that he was forced to drink urine and shot at with a BB gun, while social media posts allege racist and homophobic abuse.

On , a walkout was staged at Plano East Senior High School, protesting the administrative conduct of the school in an incident involving sexual harassment. No incidents were reported during the demonstration, and PISD officials have not yet acknowledged the incident.

List of schools
Each household in Plano ISD is zoned to an elementary school, a middle school, a high school, and a senior high school. High schools serve grades 9–10 while senior high schools serve grades 11–12; however, any 9th or 10th grader is eligible to participate in extracurricular sports at the senior high level. There are 67 schools: 44 elementary schools, 13 middles schools, 6 high schools, 3 senior high schools, and 1 alternative STEM-based high school, Plano ISD Academy High School. Out of the 67 schools, 55 are located within the city of Plano. There are 4 schools in both Murphy and Richardson, 3 schools are in North Dallas, and 1 school in Allen.

High schools (grades 9-12)

Senior high schools (grades 11-12)
 Plano West Senior High School (1999)
 Plano Senior High School (1892)
 Plano East Senior High School (1981)

High schools (grades 9-10)
 R. C. Clark High School (1979)
 T. C. Jasper High School (1996)
 C. A. McMillen High School (2011)
 Shepton High School (1984)
 W. A. Vines High School (1976)
 T. H. Williams High School (1961)

Academy Schools
PISD Academy High School (9-12)

Middle schools (grades 6-8)
 Armstrong Middle School
 1992–93 National Blue Ribbon School
 Bowman Middle School
 Carpenter Middle School
 1992–93 National Blue Ribbon School
 Frankford Middle School (within Dallas city limits)
 Haggard Middle School
 1999–2000 National Blue Ribbon School
 Hendrick Middle School
 Murphy Middle School (within Murphy city limits)
 Otto Middle School (within Plano city limits)
 Renner Middle School
 1994–96 National Blue Ribbon School
 Rice Middle School
 Robinson Middle School
 Schimelpfenig Middle School
 1988–89 National Blue Ribbon School
 Wilson Middle School
 1988–89 National Blue Ribbon School

Special Program Centers
 Bird Special Programs Center (K-8)
Guinn Special Programs Center (9-12)

Elementary schools (grades K-5)
 Aldridge Elementary School (within Richardson city limits)
 Andrews Elementary School
 Barksdale Elementary School
 Barron Elementary School
 Bethany Elementary School
 Beverly Elementary School (within Allen city limits)
 2006 National Blue Ribbon School
 Boggess Elementary School (within Murphy city limits)
 Brinker Elementary School
 1996–97 National Blue Ribbon School 
 Carlisle Elementary School
 1987–88 National Blue Ribbon School 
 Centennial Elementary School
 Christie Elementary School
 1998–99 National Blue Ribbon School 
  Daffron Elementary School
 Davis Elementary School
 1993–94 National Blue Ribbon School
 Dooley Elementary School
 1989–90 National Blue Ribbon School
 Forman Elementary School
 1993–94 National Blue Ribbon School
 Gulledge Elementary School
 Haggar Elementary School (within Dallas city limits)
 Harrington Elementary School
 Haun Elementary School
 Hedgcoxe Elementary School
 1993–94 National Blue Ribbon School
 Hickey Elementary School
 Hightower Elementary School
 Huffman Elementary School
 1991–92 National Blue Ribbon School
 Hughston Elementary School
 Hunt Elementary School (within Murphy city limits)
 Jackson Elementary School
 Mathews Elementary School
 2000–01 National Blue Ribbon School and 2005
 McCall Elementary School
 Meadows Elementary School
 1996–97 National Blue Ribbon School
 Memorial Elementary School
 Mendenhall Elementary School
 Miller Elementary School (within Richardson city limits)
 Mitchell Elementary School (within Dallas city limits)
 Rasor Elementary School
 Saigling Elementary School
 1991–92 National Blue Ribbon School and 2005
 Schell Elementary School (within Richardson city limits)
 Shepard Elementary School
 1991–92 and 2008 National Blue Ribbon School
 Sigler Elementary School
 Skaggs Elementary School
 2006 National Blue Ribbon School 
 Stinson Elementary School (within Richardson city limits)
 Thomas Elementary School
 Weatherford Elementary School
 Wells Elementary School
 1991–92 National Blue Ribbon School  and 2007 
 Wyatt Elementary School

Early childhood schools (PreK)
 Beaty Early Childhood School
 Head Start
 Isaacs Early Childhood School 
 Jupiter Center (currently closed)
 Pearson Early Childhood School
 Early Childhood School #4 (Funded-TBD: within Dallas city limits)

Feeder Schools Chart
3-4 elementary schools feed into a middle school
Note that Wilson Middle School takes students from 4 different elementary schools and half of the 5th graders from Jackson Elementary.
2-3 middle schools feed into a high school
2 high schools feed into a senior high school 
The District has had its feeder-school boundary lines redrawn at times in the recent past:

In 2009, the development of more schools in Plano's eastern region, as well as more students attending them, reignited a boundary-line debate. Certain issues, such as socio-economic integration and ethnic balance in the schools, became points of intense discussion that became very publicized and heated. Distance from McMillen and Williams also caused debate against the socioeconomic balance. Eventually, it was settled with mixed socioeconomic and ethnic balance between the two high schools. The following year, the School Board settled the debate so as to affect feeder schools going into Plano West: due to the high student populations of Plano and Plano East as compared to the lower population of Plano West, two of the most populated high schools were approved to feed into Plano West, and Schimelpfenig Middle School students could choose between two tracks, leading either to Plano Senior or Plano West.  However, this prompted some parents to be concerned about possible future overcrowding at Plano West.  In 2011, the School Board agreed to tweak their plan to ease worries about Plano West overcrowding: Schimelpfenig Middle School students would not be allowed to choose tracks, but instead would all go to Clark High and then Plano Senior High, with the option to transfer.

In 2016, the enrollment boundaries for Mendenhall, Aldridge, and Brinker Elementary Schools were redrawn so as to allow smoother transitions into their appropriate feeder schools.

See also

 List of school districts in Texas

Notes

References

External links

  Kantrowitz, Barbara. "The 1000 Best High Schools in America." Newsweek. 16 May 2005. Accessed 10 December 2005.
  "'Red & Green Clothing Ban' False Rumor".  PISD.edu. 12 December 2005. Accessed 25 December 2005.
  Breen, Kim. "O'Reilly: I made mistake". The Dallas Morning News. 21 December 2005.  Accessed 25 December 2005.
  
  
  

 
School districts in Collin County, Texas
School districts in Dallas
Independent School District
1891 establishments in Texas
School districts established in 1891